The Camp Gordon Johnston Museum is a historical museum of World War II history and artifacts. It is located at 1873 Highway 98 West in Carrabelle, Florida, across the highway from Carrabelle Beach, one of the several beaches on which troops practiced amphibious landings. The museum highlights the history of Camp Gordon Johnston, focusing especially on the quarter of a million soldiers who received training in amphibious operation in Carrabelle. The museum's exhibits include vehicles, photographs and thousands of artifacts including uniforms, mess kits and soldiers' war souvenirs. It is open from 11:00 A.M. to 5:00 P.M. on Tuesday through Saturday and it is closed on Sunday and Monday.

The museum is owned by the Camp Gordon Johnston Association, a 501(c)(3) nonprofit organization. Randy Usher serves a president of the Camp Gordon Johnston Association.

References

External links

Museums in Franklin County, Florida
World War II museums in the United States
Military and war museums in Florida